Sarah Page may refer to:

Sarah Page, a character in the science fiction television series Primeval
Sarah Page (prohibitionist) (1863–1950), New Zealand teacher, feminist, prohibitionist, socialist, social reformer, and politician
 Sarah Page, the White-American girl, allegation of sexual assault against Black-American Dick Rowland, impetus of the Tulsa race massacre